Sterling Creek is a stream in the U.S. state of Georgia. It is a tributary of the Ogeechee River.

Sterling Creek was named after brothers William and Hugh Sterling, pioneer settlers in the 1730s.

References

Rivers of Georgia (U.S. state)
Rivers of Bryan County, Georgia